Calocochlea festiva  is a species of land snail, a pulmonate gastropod mollusk in the family Camaenidae.

References

External links
 Donovan, E. (Edward). (1823-1827). The Naturalist's repository, or monthly miscellany of exotic natural history, etc. [Book series. In 5 volumes 1 (1823) - 5 (1827).]
 Semper, O. (1862). Description d'une hélice nouvelle des Philippines. Journal de Conchyliologie. 10: 146-148, pl. 5, figs. 8-9
 Richardson, L. (1983). Bradybaenidae: Catalog of species. Tryonia. 9: 1-253

Camaenidae
Gastropods described in 1841